The Forest Sandstone is a geological formation in southern Africa, dating to roughly between 200 and 190 million years ago and covering the Hettangian to Sinemurian stages of the Jurassic Period in the Mesozoic Era.  As its name suggests, it consists mainly of sandstone.

Fossils of the prosauropod dinosaur Massospondylus and the primitive sauropod Vulcanodon have been recovered from the Forest Sandstone.

Geology

Description 
The formation is a sedimentary unit, consisting mainly of aeolian sands and silts with interbedded fluvial sediments, laid down during a period of increasing aridity.

Extent 
The Forest Sandstone is found in Botswana, Zambia and Zimbabwe, in the Mid-Zambezi, Mana Pools, Cabora Bassa and Limpopo Basins, with its greatest thickness in the Cabora Bassa Basin.

Deposition

Age 
The formation is dated at 200 to 190 Ma.

Stratigraphy 
The Forest Sandstone is the penultimate formation in the Upper Karoo Group of the Karoo Supergroup, lying above the Pebbly Arkose Formation and below the Batoka Formation. In the Thuli Basin it is sometimes referred to as the Samkoto Formation.

The Forest Sandstone has been correlated to the Clarens Formation of the Great Karoo Basin in South Africa.

Fossil content

Vertebrate fauna

Economic importance

Hydrogeology 
The Forest Sandstone is the major groundwater-bearing unit of the Upper Karoo Group.

References 

Geologic formations of Botswana
Geologic formations of Zambia
Geologic formations of Zimbabwe
Jurassic System of Africa
Early Jurassic Africa
Hettangian Stage
Sinemurian Stage
Geologic formations with imbedded sand dunes
Sandstone formations
Aeolian deposits
Fluvial deposits
Fossiliferous stratigraphic units of Africa
Paleontology in Botswana
Paleontology in Zambia
Paleontology in Zimbabwe